Finger Tips is a British children's television series that aired on CITV and was broadcast from 3 September 2001 to 14 December 2008. It was produced by The Foundation.

Format
Finger Tips is an arts and crafts series that centres around creating things with objects that can be found in your home. The makes produced on the show were divided up into different categories:
 Top Make: A major project, normally at the start of the show
 Food Finger Tips: Easy cooking and baking recipes
 Fun Finger Tips: Self-made games
 Little Finger Tips: Items made for making over odds and ends from around the home
 Makeover Finger Tips: Basically the same as "Little Finger Tips"- replaced it in later shows

"Top Make" and "Little" or "Make-Over Finger Tips" featured in every show, and "Fun" and "Food Tips" were usually in alternate shows. There were also more specialised categories which ran briefly, they were:

 Fizzics Finger-Tips: Fun science experiment
 Cryptic Finger-Tips: A special series on code-breaker
 Green Finger-Tips: Plant-related project
 Techno Finger-Tips: Projects using a computer
 Party Finger-Tips: Party idea

Special challenge is the "One-Minute-Make". In this game one of the presenters tries to make something with only a few things in less than 60 seconds. This is featured in every show, with one presenter making the project, and the other timing it, alternating in each episode.

Production
The series was recorded at The Maidstone Studios in Kent, former home to TVS Television.

It was presented by Stephen Mulhern and Fearne Cotton. For Series 4, Naomi Wilkinson replaced Cotton as the female presenter.

The series was axed by ITV in 2004, after de-commissioning their original children's programming. However, in 2008, the series was revived for a new season, with Wilkinson returning as the female presenter, while the male presenter role was taken over by Tim Dixon.

Series guide

Series 1: 13 x 17′ (3 September 2001 – 26 November 2001)
Series 2: 20 x 15’ / 7 x 10’ / 3 x 5’ (2 September 2002 – 27 September 2002)
Series 3: 20 x 15’ / 5 x 12’ (2 June 2003 – 27 June 2003)
Series 4: 13 x 15’ / 7 x 5’ (10 June 2004 – 2 September 2004)
Series 5: 30 x 15’ / 30 x 11’ (6 September 2008 – 14 December 2008)

VHS/DVDs
VHS and DVDs of the series were released by Right Entertainment/Universal Pictures Video in the United Kingdom. They were titled Make and Do at your Finger Tips (after the show's tagline), and featured episodes from the second and third series.

International broadcast
In 2002, the series was licensed internationally to Entertainment Rights.

The show has also been broadcast in Austria, Belgium, Canada, France, Germany (Super RTL since September 2004), Greece, Hong Kong, India, Malaysia, New Zealand, Slovenia, Singapore, Switzerland, Taiwan, Thailand, Turkey, Vietnam, Kuwait, and Romania.

References

External links

2000s British children's television series
2001 British television series debuts
2008 British television series endings
ITV children's television shows
Television series by Banijay